RichCopy is a file copy utility program developed by Ken Tamaru of Microsoft Corporation, discontinued in 2010. It is multi-threaded, which permits it under some circumstances to copy files faster than some other copiers available for the Windows operating system.  It provides a complete graphical user interface (GUI), whereas Microsoft's multi-threaded Robocopy is a command-line utility, although there are GUI interfaces for it.

Features
 Can copy several files simultaneously ("multi-threaded"), which under certain network conditions, may reduce the time required for file transfers.
 Can be invoked either as a command-line utility or via a graphical user interface (GUI).
 If used with the GUI, can generate the command line to carry out the action specified for the GUI.

Criticisms
 Bugs not fixed before support was discontinued remain. RichCopy is best utilized by experienced users who know how to verify that copy operations have completed successfully without errors.
 RichCopy is not supported by Microsoft. The program has not been updated since approximately June 2009, despite numerous users requesting bug fixes.
 Duplicates Robocopy functionality.

Defects
RichCopy will not copy files that are opened with certain combinations of file sharing attributes. Any process may open files for exclusive read access by withholding the FILE_SHARE_READ Another company created non-free GS RichCopy 360, which can copy open files and has been developed further.

See also 
 Robocopy
 copy (command)
 XCOPY
 Teracopy
 rsync
 SyncToy
 Ultracopier
 SuperCopier
 GS RichCopy 360
 List of file copying software

References

External links
 Official sources
Microsoft TechNet Magazine -- Free Utility: RichCopy, an Advanced Alternative To Robocopy
 TechNet Blog of RichCopy developer Ken Tamaru
TechNet - Command-line Reference - ROBOCOPY
 Other
TechNet Blog of Keith Combs describes advantages of using RichCopy and WinRAR to transfer multiple large files simultaneously.
RichCopy How-To Guide
Five Best Alternative File Copiers

File copy utilities
Discontinued Microsoft software
Microsoft free software
Windows-only free software